Zakariyyā al-Ansārī was a leading Sunni Muslim polymath ʿĀlim of the 15th century.

Biography

Birth
He was born in or around 1420 CE, in Sunaika, located in the Egyptian province of Sharqiyya.

Education
During his adolescence, al- Ansārī moved to Cairo to study at al-Azhar University. He lived in such poverty there, that he would venture out into the night in search of water faucets and the rinds of watermelon.  However, according to al-Ansārī's own account, after a few years at al-Azhar, a mill worker came to his aid. He provided the young al-Ansārī with money for his food, clothing and books. al-Ansārī told of a remarkable encounter with his benefactor told him,

Eventually, this foretelling would prove to be accurate. While a student, al- Ansārī studied under al-Qāyāti, Ibn Hajar al-Asqalāni, Jalāl al-Dīn al Mahallī, Al-Kamal ibn al-Humam and Sharaf al-Din al Munawi.

Teaching
Zakariyyā al-Ansārī held the office of Shāfi’ī qādī for a twenty-year period during the reign of Qā’it Bey. Over the course of his lifetime, al-Ansārī spent eighty years engaged as a teacher and muftī. One of al-Ansārī students was al-Sha’rānī, who was responsible for much of the information that survives in regards to the life of al-Ansārī. Of his teacher, al-Sha’rānī wrote that al-Ansārī was, "a pillar of the fiqh and the tasawwuf".

Al-Ansārī held several teaching positions over the course of his life, which included professorships at the madrasa of the mausoleum of al-Shāfī and the madrasa Jāmaliyya.

Death
Al-Ansārī died in 1520, in Cairo, at the age of 100. He was given the honorary title "Shaikh al-Islam" and is known for the legacy of his mystic and legal writings. Al-Ansārī gained fame especially in Indonesia and Malaya due to his frequent mention as a source for Malay writers.

Legacy
In terms of al-Ansārī's Sufi legacy, his name is also remembered in connection to his student al-Sha’rānī. Al-Sha’rānī established Neo-Sufism, also known as the "middle course". Neo-Sufism combines tasawwuf and fiqh.

Works
Fifty-two writings are listed under al-Ansārī's name in Brockelmann's Geschichte der Arabischen Litteratur. These writings include, but are not limited to, topics of logic, grammar, philosophy, scientific terminology, rhetoric, Quranic exegesis, Holy Tradition, the life of Muhammad, jurisprudence (fiqh), dogma and mysticism. 

Some of al-Ansārī's most famous works include: Manhaj al-tullab ("The Way of the Students"), Fath al-Wahhab ("The help of the Bountiful"), Tuhfat al-tullāb (“The Gift offered to the Students"), Lubb al-usul ("The Kernel of the Science of the roots"), and his commentary on al-Qushairī's Risāla fī ‘l-tasawwuf.

From an early age, Zakariyyā al-Ansārī was attracted to mysticism. So encompassing was his interest, that al-Ansārī claimed no one expected much of anything from him in the way of legal studies.  Al-Ansārī studied, and was initiated as a Sufi under Muhammad al-Ghamrī. He wrote several treaties on Sufism, but al-Ansārī is especially well known for his commentary on al-Qushairī’s Risāla fī ‘l-tasawwuf. In this commentary he defines tasawwuf in a number of ways, complete earnestness in the progression towards the King of all kings;... it is the devotion to works of good and the avoidance of defects."''

His commentaries on the Sahih of Bukhari, Abhari’s adaptation of Isagoge, al-Jazari’s tajwid and his Futuhat al-ilahiyya on mysticism are among Ansārī's most popular texts in Indonesia.

See also 
 List of Ash'aris and Maturidis
 List of Muslim theologians
 List of Sufis

References 

Asharis
Shafi'is
Sunni Sufis
Shaykh al-Islāms
Mujaddid
15th-century Egyptian historians
1420 births
1520 deaths
15th-century people from the Mamluk Sultanate
16th-century Egyptian historians
15th-century jurists
16th-century jurists
Supporters of Ibn Arabi